Robin Brüseke (born 14 September 1993) is a German professional footballer who plays as a goalkeeper for Rot Weiss Ahlen.

Career statistics

References

1993 births
Living people
German footballers
Association football goalkeepers
SC Verl players
Rot Weiss Ahlen players
3. Liga players
Regionalliga players